The Women's 200 metre individual medley competition at the 2022 World Aquatics Championships was held on 18 and 19 June 2022.

Records
Prior to the competition, the existing world and championship records were as follows.

Results

Heats
The heats were started on 18 June at 09:00.

Semifinals
The semifinals were started on 18 June at 19:04.

Final
The final was held on 19 June at 19:27.

References

Women's 200 metre individual medley